La Llama Eterna is the first studio album by the Asturian power metal band Avalanch, released in 1997. This work was later released in English under the name Eternal Flame on April 17, 2002.

Track listing
 "La Llama Eterna" – 5:08
 "El Mundo Perdido" – 6:29
 "El Despertar" – 1:17
 "Vicio Letal" – 4:52
 "Esclavo de la Ira" – 5:35
 "Avalon, la Morada del Rey Arturo" – 1:12
 "Excalibur" – 6:22
 "Sigue así" – 4:43
 "Rainbow Warrior" – 5:58
 "Juego cruel" – 6:05
 "La Taberna" – 3:30
 "Avalanch" – 12:33
 "El Cierre de la Taberna – 2:01

Personnel
Vocals: Juan Lozano
Bass: Francisco Fidalgo
Chorus: Elena Pérez Herrero, Mauricio Septién, Fernando Mon, Juan Moyano
Percussion: Fernando Arias
Flute: Lluis 
The rest of the instruments: Alberto Rionda

References

1997 albums
Avalanch albums